The Bistrișoara is a left tributary of the Arieș in Romania. It flows into the Arieș in Bistra.

References

Rivers of Romania
Rivers of Alba County